Agrionympha karoo is a species of moth belonging to the family Micropterigidae. It was described by George W. Gibbs and Niels P. Kristensen in 2011. It is found in South Africa, where it is known only from the Eastern Cape.

It lives amongst Adiantum species and other ferns on rocky banks of streams where seepage maintains very limited growth of thallose liverworts and mosses in an otherwise hot and arid environment.

The length of the forewings is about 2.5 mm for males 2.6 mm for females.

Etymology
The species is named after the semi-arid region in which it occurs, the Karoo.

References

Endemic moths of South Africa
Micropterigidae
Moths described in 2011
Moths of Africa